Darren Cahill (born 2 October 1965) is a tennis coach and former professional tennis player from Australia. In addition, Cahill is a tennis analyst for the Grand Slam events on the US sports network ESPN and a coach with the Adidas Player Development Program and at ProTennisCoach.com.

Career

Player
Cahill turned professional in 1984. He won his first tour doubles title in 1985 at the Melbourne Outdoor tournament. In 1987, he won his first top-level singles title at New Haven.

Cahill's best singles performance at a Grand Slam event came at the 1988 US Open, where he knocked out Lawson Duncan, Boris Becker, Marcelo Ingaramo (a walkover after Ingaramo withdrew), Martin Laurendeau, and Aaron Krickstein on the way to reaching the semifinals, where he lost to eventual champion Mats Wilander.

In 1989, Cahill finished runner-up in men's doubles at the Australian Open partnering fellow Aussie Mark Kratzmann. Also with Kratzmann, Cahill won the ATP Championships in Cincinnati.

Cahill was a member of the Australian team which reached the final of the Davis Cup in 1990. The team lost 3–2 to the United States in the final. Cahill compiled a 6–4 career Davis Cup record (4–0 in doubles and 2–4 in singles).

Cahill won his last tour singles title in 1991 at San Francisco. His last doubles title came in 1994 in Sydney.

In 1989, Cahill's reached his career peak doubles ranking of world no. 10 and his peak singles ranking of no. 22 in 1989. After chronic knee injuries and ten operations, he retired from the professional tour in 1995.

Coach

Since retiring from the tour, Cahill has been a successful tennis coach and guided Lleyton Hewitt to become the youngest player ever ranked world no. 1. After Hewitt, Cahill coached Andre Agassi, who under Cahill became the oldest player ever to be ranked world no. 1 in May 2003. Cahill joined the Adidas Player Development Program after Agassi retired in 2006 and has worked with high-profile players, including Andy Murray, Ana Ivanovic, Fernando Verdasco, Daniela Hantuchová, Sorana Cîrstea, and Simona Halep. In 2017 and 2018, he coached Halep to No.1 on the WTA Tour and the 2018 French Open championship. After a year away, Cahill rejoined with Halep in 2020.

In addition to coaching individual players, Cahill was the Australian Davis Cup coach from 2007 until February 2009. He is also an Adidas talent scout and works with promising junior players worldwide. He is now a member of the Adidas Player Development Program. With Roger Rasheed, Brad Gilbert, and Paul Annacone, Cahill is a coach at ProTennisCoach.com, an open-access, professional coaching website. Cahill is also involved with PlaySight Interactive, a sports technology company behind the SmartCourt. Along with Paul Annacone, he heads up PlaySight's Coaching and Player Development team, helping the company to bring its technology to more tennis coaches and players across the world.

In January 2022, Cahill began coaching tennis player Amanda Anisimova as a trial coach. He joined as a coach for Jannik Sinner in July 2022.

Media
Since 2007, Cahill is a tennis analyst for the global sports network ESPN for three of the four major tennis Grand Slams: the Australian Open, Wimbledon and the US Open. He also works for the Australian television network Channel 7 for the Hopman Cup and Australian Open.

Personal life
Cahill is the son of Australian rules football player and coach John Cahill. He has two children, Tahlia and Benjamin. His nickname is Killer. He was an Australian Institute of Sport scholarship holder.

ATP career finals

Singles: 3 (2 titles, 1 runner-up)

Doubles: 20 (13–7)

Mixed doubles: 1 (0–1)

Performance timelines

Singles

Doubles

Mixed Doubles

References

External links
 
 
 
 

1965 births
American television sports announcers
Australian expatriate sportspeople in the United States
Australian Institute of Sport tennis players
Australian male tennis players
Australian tennis coaches
Living people
Tennis players from Adelaide
Sportspeople from the Las Vegas Valley
Australian tennis commentators
Tennis people from Nevada 
Tennis players at the 1988 Summer Olympics
Olympic tennis players of Australia
People educated at Sacred Heart College, Adelaide